Flukea is a genus of hoverflies from the family Syrphidae, in the order Diptera.

Species
Flukea vockerothi Etcheverry, 1966

References

Diptera of South America
Hoverfly genera